The Vatican City Championship is the top men's association football league of Vatican City. Founded in 1972 as the Coppa Amicizia, teams are composed of workers representing various state departments. Teams are permitted to field an outside player from Italian amateur teams to play as goalkeeper. The league's best players are combined to form the Vatican City national team for rare friendly matches. The Vatican football association, Federazione Vaticanese Giuoco Calcio, is not a member of FIFA and is overseen by its president Domenico Ruggerio as of May 2014. All matches are played at the Associazione Sportivo La Salle complex in Western Rome, although the larger Campo Cardinale Francis Joseph Spellman served as home until recently. The league has amateur status with matches and training taking place outside of work hours. Matches take place on Mondays and Tuesdays. Equipment and uniforms are occasionally donated by organizations and benefactors with deficits being covered by the Vatican government. The league takes place between October and May each year with a two-month break in December and January.

History
The first organized football took place in the Vatican in 1947 when a four-team league was staged. The final that year was contested between Pontifical Villas and Fabbrica di San Pietro. The league was suspended shortly after creation because of fierce competitiveness. Only friendly matches were allowed for the next two decades until another league was reformed in 1966. Seven teams competed during the first season with employees of  L’Osservatore Romano, the Vatican newspaper, claiming the first championship. The current league was founded as the Coppa Amicizia, later renamed the Campionato della Citta Vaticano, by Sergio Valci who was former president of the FA  and a Vatican healthcare employee until his death in 2012.

A secondary cup known as the Coppa ACDV was created in 1985. It was renamed the Coppa Sergio Valci in 1994. The Vatican Supercoppa began in 2005 and sees the winner of the Campionato della Citta Vaticano face the Coppa ACDV winners.

Teams in the 2019–20 season

 Source: Sport in Vaticano

Champions

Source:

Top scorers

Notable former players and coaches
 Gabriele Giordano Caccia - Apostolic Nuncio to Lebanon
/ Dino da Costa-former Italian international
Source(s):

See also
 Sport in Vatican City
 Index of Vatican City–related articles

References

Footnotes

External links
Official Vatican Sports

See also
Vatican City national football team
Coppa Sergio Valci
Clericus Cup

Vatican City
Sport in Vatican City
1973 establishments in Europe
Sports leagues established in 1973
Football in the Vatican City